This article is a collection of statewide polls for the 2016 United States presidential election. The polls listed here, by state are from 2013 to December 31, 2015, and provide early data on opinion polling between a possible Republican candidate against a possible Democratic candidate.

Note: Some states did not conduct polling before December 31, 2015

Alaska
3 electoral votes (Republican in 2008) 59%–38%(Republican in 2012) 55%–41%

Arizona
11 electoral votes (Republican in 2008) 53%–45%(Republican in 2012) 53%–44%

Arkansas
6 electoral votes (Republican in 2008) 59%–39%(Republican in 2012) 61%–37%

California
55 electoral votes (Democratic in 2008) 61%–37%(Democratic in 2012) 60%–37%

Colorado
9 electoral votes (Democratic in 2008) 54%–45%(Democratic in 2012) 51%–46%

Connecticut
7 electoral votes (Democratic in 2008) 61%–38%(Democratic in 2012) 58%–41%

Florida

29 electoral votes (Democratic in 2008) 51%–48%(Democratic in 2012) 50%–49%

Georgia
16 electoral votes (Republican in 2008) 52%–47%(Republican in 2012) 53%–45%

Idaho
4 electoral votes (Republican in 2008) 61%–36%(Republican in 2012) 64%–32%

Illinois
20 electoral votes (Democratic in 2008) 62%–37%(Democratic in 2012) 58%–41%

Iowa
6 electoral votes (Democratic in 2008) 54%–44%(Democratic in 2012) 52%–46%

Three-way race

Kansas

6 electoral votes(Republican in 2008) 56%–42%   (Republican in 2012) 60%–38%

Kentucky

8 electoral votes(Republican in 2008) 57%–41%   (Republican in 2012) 60%–38%

Louisiana

8 electoral votes(Republican in 2008) 59%–40%   (Republican in 2012) 58%–41%

Maine

4 electoral votes(Democratic in 2008) 58%–40%   (Democratic in 2012) 56%–41%

Maryland

10 electoral votes(Democratic in 2008) 62%–36%   (Democratic in 2012) 62%–36%

Massachusetts

11 electoral votes(Democratic in 2008) 62%–36%   (Democratic in 2012) 61%–38%

Michigan

16 electoral votes(Democratic in 2008) 57%–41%   (Democratic in 2012) 54%–45%

Minnesota

10 electoral votes(Democratic in 2008) 54%–44%   (Democratic in 2012) 53%–45%

Three-way race

Mississippi

6 electoral votes(Republican in 2008) 56%–43%   (Republican in 2012) 55%–44%

Missouri

10 electoral votes(Republican in 2008) 49.4%–49.2%   (Republican in 2012) 53%–44%

Three-way race

Montana

3 electoral votes(Republican in 2008) 49%–47%   (Republican in 2012) 55%–42%

Nevada

6 electoral votes(Democratic in 2008) 55%–43%   (Democratic in 2012) 52%–46%

New Hampshire

4 electoral votes(Democratic in 2008) 54%–45%   (Democratic in 2012) 52%–46%

Three-way race

New Jersey
14 electoral votes(Democratic in 2008) 57%–42%   (Democratic in 2012) 58%–41%

New Mexico
5 electoral votes(Democratic in 2008) 57%–42%   (Democratic in 2012) 53%–43%

New York

29 electoral votes(Democratic in 2008) 63%–36%   (Democratic in 2012) 63%–35%

North Carolina

15 electoral votes(Democratic in 2008) 50%–49%   (Republican in 2012) 50%–48%

Three-way race

Ohio

18 electoral votes(Democratic in 2008) 51%–47%   (Democratic in 2012) 51%–48%

↑ Poll conducted for the Ohio Democratic Party

Three-way race

Oregon
7 electoral votes(Democratic in 2008) 57%–40%   (Democratic in 2012) 54%–42%

Pennsylvania
20 electoral votes(Democratic in 2008) 54%–44%   (Democratic in 2012) 52%–47%

Three-way race

South Carolina

9 electoral votes(Republican in 2008) 54%–45%   (Republican in 2012) 55%–44%

Three-way race

Texas

38 electoral votes(Republican in 2008) 55%–44%   (Republican in 2012) 57%–41%

Utah

6 electoral votes(Republican in 2008) 62%–34%   (Republican in 2012) 73%–25%

Virginia

13 electoral votes  (Democratic in 2008) 53%–46%   (Democratic in 2012) 51%–47%

Three-way race

Washington
12 electoral votes(Democratic in 2008) 57%–40%   (Democratic in 2012) 56%–41%

West Virginia
5 electoral votes(Republican in 2008) 56%–43%   (Republican in 2012) 62%–36%

Wisconsin
10 electoral votes  (Democratic in 2008) 56%–42%   (Democratic in 2012) 53%–46%

Wyoming

3 electoral votes  (Republican in 2008) 65%–33%   (Republican in 2012) 69%–28%

References

Opinion polling for the 2016 United States presidential election